The 123rd Maine Senate had 35 members each elected to two-year terms in November 2006. The first regular session was sworn-in on December 6, 2006.

The party composition of the 123rd Senate was:
 18 Democrats
 17 Republicans

Leadership

Senators

See also
 List of Maine State Senators

References

External links
 Maine Senate

Maine legislative sessions
2006 in Maine
2007 in Maine
2008 in Maine
2000s in Maine